Rehguzar is a 1985 Indian direct-to-video film directed by Jyoti Sarup starring the Shekhar Suman, Simple Kapadia, Bharat Bhushan and Jyoti Sarup himself. The film was first released for video in 1985, it was later telecasted on Doordarshan in 1989. This film had the music of Sardar Anjum, this is the only film for which he ever gave music.

Plot
A small town, aspiring, lyricist Shekhar goes to Bombay to make it big. He stays in the city on rent in a house, which is owned by a person from his town. The daughter of his landlord, Simple falls in love with him and he reciprocates the feelings too. Meanwhile he meets the secretary of a famous lyricist in the business. The secretary buys his lyrics and passes it on to his boss who records the songs, which become hits. Frustrated by ghost-writing for others he searches ways to get famous himself. He meets a famous female singer, Aarti who, liking his lyrics, sings for his songs and helps him become famous.

The conflict for him arises when he learns that the Aarti also loves him. The secretary takes advantage of the situation and tries to create a rift between Aarti and Shekhar so that she sings for the lyrics written by his boss. While Shekhar is in a dilemma, of what to do because he is in love with Simple, and Aarti is the one who has helped him achieve whatever he wanted in life, Aarti finds out she has cancer. Clearing things with Shekhar, she then dies of the disease.

Cast
Shekhar Suman as Shekhar
Simple Kapadia as Simple
Aarti Mehta as Aarti
Bharat Bhushan as Landlord
Mayur as Film Star
Jyoti Sarup as Lyrics writer's secretary

Songs
"Har Sitam Jhel Kar" – Minoo Purushottam
"Husn Par Jab Kabhi Shabab Aaya" – Minoo Purushottam
"Jab Talak Hai Shabab Rehne Do" – Anup Jalota
"Kya Kahoon Meherbaan Nahi Maloom" – Minoo Purushottam
"Nainon Mein Chori Chori" – Aarti Mukherjee
"Zakhm Rehguzaaron Ke Yaad Un Baharon Ki" – Minoo Purushottam

References

External links
 

1985 films
1980s Hindi-language films
Indian direct-to-video films